The 1919 Cornell Big Red football team was an American football team that represented Cornell University during the 1919 college football season.  In their first season under head coach John H. Rush, the Big Red compiled a 3–5 record and were outscored by their opponents by a combined total of 95 to 34.

Schedule

References

Cornell
Cornell Big Red football seasons
Cornell Big Red football